Jesús Géles (born February 22, 1988) is a Colombian former professional boxer who competed from 2008 to 2014 and held the WBO junior flyweight title in 2011.

Professional career

Géles defeated Omar Soto to win the interim WBO junior flyweight title by majority decision on October 30, 2010 after original opponent Ramón García Hirales pulled out. He was then promoted to full WBO champion on March 11, 2011, after Giovani Segura vacated the title. Géles lost the title in his first defense, a rematch against García Hirales, on April 30, 2011, by fourth-round knockout.

Professional boxing record

See also
List of world light-flyweight boxing champions

References

External links

1988 births
Living people
Colombian male boxers
Sportspeople from Cartagena, Colombia
Light-flyweight boxers
Flyweight boxers
World light-flyweight boxing champions
World Boxing Organization champions
21st-century Colombian people